Naeem Baloch served as the Governor of the Helmand Province in Afghanistan from 2012 until 2015. Prior to that, he worked as an Afghan intelligence officer in the Helmand Province.

References

External links

Living people
Governors of Helmand Province
Baloch people
Year of birth missing (living people)